Upside can refer to:

 The Upside, a 2017 American film
 Upside (magazine) was a San Francisco-based business and technology magazine 
 Upside Records, a record label
 Upside (film), a 2010 American film
 "Upside", a 2008 song by James from the album Hey Ma

See also
 Downside (disambiguation)
 Upside Down (disambiguation)